The KMW+Nexter Defense Systems (KNDS) is a European defence industry holding company, which is the result of a merger between Krauss-Maffei Wegmann and Nexter Systems. The joint holding company is based in Amsterdam, Netherlands.

History
KNDS is the joint holding company formed by German family-controlled defence company Krauss-Maffei Wegmann (KMW) and the French government-owned weapons manufacturer Nexter, two of the leading European manufacturers of military land systems.

Negotiations between the companies and the German and French governments started in Summer 2014 and support for a merger has been building in both Germany and France. Presenting the project to French lawmakers in January 2015, CEOs of both companies assumed that the new holding would boost production for both manufacturers by avoiding export restrictions, especially in Germany. In July 2015 the National Assembly voted in favour of a measure that permits the privatisation of state-owned defence companies, paving the way for KMW and Nexter to join forces. On 29 July 2015 the merger between the two companies had been officially signed in Paris. The merger was completed in December 2015 when the supervisory board appointed the new CEO of Nexter Systems, Stéphane Mayer, and the chairman of the executive board of KMW, Frank Haun, as CEOs of the holding company.

The total number of employees at KNDS and its subsidiaries is 8,270 with a year 2020 turnover of €2.4 billion, an order backlog of around €10.6 billion and an order intake of €3.3 billion. The range of its products includes main battle tanks, armored vehicles, artillery systems, weapons systems, ammunition, military bridges, customer services, battle management systems, training, protection and a wide range of equipment.

Products
In June 2018 the German and French ministries of defence signed a letter of intent for KNDS to develop the Main Ground Combat System (MGCS), a common main battle tank, and the Common Indirect Fire System, a common 155mm self-propelled artillery gun.

Leopard 2 upgrade
One of KNDS's first projects was upgrading the Leopard 2, with a focus on increasing effectiveness against contemporary threats like anti-tank guided missiles and the Russian T-14 Armata tank.

Main Combat Ground System

Common Indirect Fire System
The Common Indirect Fire System (CIFS) is a French-German program to develop a 155mm self-propelled artillery gun.  Introduction of the CIFS is scheduled for 2040.

References 

Military industry
Nexter Systems
Defence companies of the Netherlands